Point Lepreau is a cape in southwestern New Brunswick, Canada.

It is at the southern tip of a  peninsula that extends into the Bay of Fundy. This peninsula contains the boundary between Saint John County to the east and Charlotte County to the west, although the southernmost tip at Point Lepreau is within Charlotte County.

Point Lepreau forms the eastern limit of Maces Bay.

Point Lepreau Lighthouse

The point hosts a light station owned by the Canadian Coast Guard and managed by NB Power.

See also
 List of lighthouses in New Brunswick
 List of lighthouses in Canada

References

External links
 Aids to Navigation Canadian Coast Guard

Lepreau
Landforms of Charlotte County, New Brunswick
Lighthouses in New Brunswick